Diego-Suárez is a city at the northern tip of Madagascar in Antsiranana province. It was a French colony in the late 19th century until the colony's administration was subsumed into that of Madagascar in 1896. It was renamed as Antsiranana in 1975.

Postage Stamps
The colony issued its own postage stamps from 1890 to 1894, managing to produce over 60 types in that short time.

See also 
Antsiranana
Postage stamps and postal history of Madagascar

Sources 
Stanley Gibbons: various catalogues
 Encyclopaedia of Postal Authorities
Rossiter, Stuart & John Flower. The Stamp Atlas. London: Macdonald, 1986, p. 331.

References 

Philately by country
History of Madagascar
Communications in Madagascar
Diana Region